1800 Club is a residential skyscraper in the Edgewater neighborhood of Miami, Florida, United States. It was completed in 2007. The building is located east of Biscayne Boulevard and fronts Margaret Pace Park and Biscayne Bay. Floors 1-5 are occupied by retail, while floors 6-40 are residential condominiums and apartments. The building is located at the corner of North Bayshore Drive and Northeast 18th Street. It was awarded the SARA Design Award in 2002 for its exterior architectural appeal.

Gallery

See also
List of tallest buildings in Miami

References

External links
1800 Club on Emporis.com

Buildings and structures completed in 2007
Residential skyscrapers in Miami
2007 establishments in Florida